Hernandia didymantha is a species of plant in the family Hernandiaceae. It is found in Colombia, Costa Rica, Honduras, Nicaragua, and Panama.

References

Hernandiaceae
Near threatened plants
Flora of Colombia
Flora of Costa Rica
Flora of Honduras
Flora of Nicaragua
Flora of Panama
Taxonomy articles created by Polbot